Gikor is a 1934 Armenian melodrama film directed by Amasi Martirosyan, starring Hrachia Nersisyan, Avet Avetisyan and Hasmik. The film is based on Hovhannes Tumanyan's poem of the same name.

Plot 
Hambo takes his son Gikor to the city to work there and gain an education. Gikor is left in the service of a well-to-do merchant, Bazaz Artem, as a servant.

Cast 

Hrachia Nersisyan – Hambo
Avet Avetisyan – Bazaz Artem
Hasmik – Dedi
M. Jrpetyan – Nato
Tatyana Makhmuryan – Nani
H. Poghosyan – Gikor
D. Aghbalyan – Zani
L. Alaverdyan – Guest
D. Amiberkyan – Hambal
Aram Amirbekyan – Bago
M. Beroyan – Guest
Tatul Dilakyan – Vaso
Gurgen Gabrielyan – Flower man
K. Geghamyan – Peasant
A. Ghukasyan – Guest
Arkady Harutyunyan – Dukanchi
S. Mirzoyan – Peasant

References

External links
 

1934 films
Films based on works by Hovhannes Tumanyan
Films directed by Amasi Martirosyan
Soviet black-and-white films
Films set in Armenia
Soviet-era Armenian films
Armenfilm films
Soviet drama films
1934 drama films
Melodrama films
Armenian drama films
Armenian black-and-white films